Events from the year 1232 in Ireland.

Incumbent
Lord: Henry III

Events

Chancery set up in Ireland.

Births

Deaths

References

 
1230s in Ireland
Ireland
Years of the 13th century in Ireland